Samut Sakhon Futsal Club (Thai สโมสรฟุตซอลสมุทรสาคร) is a Thai Futsal club based in Samut Sakhon Province. The club plays in the Thailand Futsal League.

External links 
 Samut Sakhon Futsal Club

Futsal clubs in Thailand
Samut Sakhon province
Futsal clubs established in 2008
2008 establishments in Thailand